Timothy M. Devinney is an Australian-American management scholar.  He currently holds the position of Chair and Professor of International Business and Strategy at Alliance Manchester Business School. He is a prior Co-Editor of Academy of Management Perspectives, co-editor of the Advances in International Management book series, co-editor of Annals in Social Responsibility, and Editor of the Social Science Research Network’s (SSRN), International Business and Management and Social Policy and Environment Networks (IBMSPEN). He is a trustee of the Society for the Advancement of Management Studies (SAMS).

He received a BSc (magna cum laude – Psychology and Applied Mathematics) from Carnegie Mellon University and MA, MBA, and PhD in Economics from the University of Chicago.

Timothy Devinney previously served as professor of the Australian Graduate School of Management (AGSM). He has held visiting appointments on the faculties of UCLA, Vanderbilt University, University of Chicago, London Business School, Copenhagen Business School, The Humboldt University of Berlin, Trier University, Hamburg University, Hong Kong University of Science and Technology, and City University - Hong Kong.

Research
Devinney works in the areas of International Business and Corporate Social Responsibility(CSR), in particular spreading information, political risk and aiding citizens.

Awards
International Fellow of the Advanced Institute of Management (AIM).  

Fellow of the Academy of International Business.

Fellow of the Academy of Social Sciences.

Distinguished Member of the Australia-New Zealand Academy of Management.  

Forschungspries and Fellow of the Alexander von Humboldt Foundation (AvH).

Fellow of the Academy of Management.

Academic staff of the University of Technology Sydney
Academic staff of Copenhagen Business School
Living people
Carnegie Mellon University alumni
University of Chicago Booth School of Business alumni
University of Chicago alumni
Year of birth missing (living people)

Management
Management scientists
Central Catholic High School (Pittsburgh) alumni